Upul Liyanage is one of the veteran media officials in Sri Lanka. He starts his education in Panadura Sumangala College. Having the 5th year scholarship to Thurstan College Colombo. He did his higher education in the Tunku Abdul Rahman University College (TAR UC). He worked much of his life in the media and entertainment fields.

Early life
Upul Liyanage was born Gammanage Upul Ranjana Liyanage on 17 January 1963. His father was Arthur Liyanage, a high ranker in co-operate sector of Sri Lanka. His mother, Dharma Liyanage, was a medical official in one of the leading maternal hospitals in Sri Lanka. He took part in various sports at school, including boxing and cricket.

Education
Upul Liyanage started his education in Panadura Sumangala College. Having good results from his year 5 scholarship he sets off to study in one of the leading schools in Sri Lanka, Thurstan College Colombo. Having done his high school studies there, Upul Liyanage graduates to the Tunku Abdul Rahman University College. Being graduated from there he completes a course in TV/Film Production conducted by OCIC Sri Lanka. Then he pursues his dreams of enhancing the quality and performance of the media sector in Sri Lanka. He also completes a television cinematography course conducted by TV Technology, a certificate in vocational training course in Electronic Technology conducted by Joseph's Radio Laboratory, diploma in Film and Television Direction offered by Westminster University, successfully completed Web Based Certification course in International Institute of Project Management (IIPM)- Chennai and a special training in Maxis Malaysia on satellite communication.

Career

Upul Liyanage starts his career in Saudi Arabia as a cable television operator at Ministry of Defense & Aviation, Saudi Arabia. Then working as a TV producer at Saudi Arabian Thaif International School in Dhahran from 1989 to 1991, he gains experience he needs to enhance quality of media in Sri Lanka. Then he works as a TV technician at Uni Walkers Ltd, Sri Lanka. Then he goes on to work at MTV/MBC (Sirasa TV), Sri Lanka as an Executive Producer. Then he works as the officer in Charge-MCR & Production at ETV, He also works in TNL as the Officer in charge of MCR. Then he works in VIS Broadcasting (Pvt) Ltd apparently holding the position of Director Operations & Director Broadcasting. He also established Voice of Asia (Siyatha Fm) and held the position of managing director. He is also a visiting lecturer for audio visual production in NITESL- National Institute of Technical Education of Sri Lanka.

Achievements

Upul Liyanage won an award for the production of "Ran Dunuke Malak"  by OCIC Sri Lanka- 1987, he won an award from the Netherlands for "Back to Business" the Documentary invented for the Federation of Chambers of Commerce and Industry of Sri Lanka, he also won an award for the documentary of "Rail 2000" (Exhibition & musical event) organized by the Ceylon Government Railway, he was nominated for 1st Five, Best Musical Production ("Asuru Senine") in Sumathi Tele Awards – 1999 and he won an award for the Production of "Tharuna Aruna" by the Ministry of Skills Development in 2005.

Present life
Upul Liyanage is currently owning a group of companies (Extreme Media Move) which is a leading event management and event handling company in Sri Lanka. He is also a director and the co-owner of ccn.lk, which is a government recognized news providing website. And he is a visiting lecturer to the NITESL- National Institute of Technical Education of Sri Lanka.

References

1963 births
Living people
Sinhalese businesspeople
Alumni of Thurstan College
Alumni of the University of Westminster
People from Colombo